In chemistry, a reactive intermediate or an intermediate is a short-lived, high-energy, highly reactive molecule. When generated in a chemical reaction, it will quickly convert into a more stable molecule. Only in exceptional cases can these compounds be isolated and stored, e.g. low temperatures, matrix isolation. When their existence is indicated, reactive intermediates can help explain how a chemical reaction takes place.

Most chemical reactions take more than one elementary step to complete, and a reactive intermediate is a high-energy, yet stable, product that exists only in one of the intermediate steps. The series of steps together make a reaction mechanism.  A reactive intermediate differs from a reactant or product or a simple reaction intermediate only in that it cannot usually be isolated but is sometimes observable only through fast spectroscopic methods. It is stable in the sense that an elementary reaction forms the reactive intermediate and the elementary reaction in the next step is needed to destroy it.

When a reactive intermediate is not observable, its existence must be inferred through experimentation. This usually involves changing reaction conditions such as temperature or concentration and applying the techniques of chemical kinetics, chemical thermodynamics, or spectroscopy. Reactive intermediates based on carbon are radicals, carbenes, carbocations, carbanions, arynes, and carbynes.

Common features
Reactive intermediates have several features in common:
 low concentration with respect to reaction substrate and final reaction product
 with the exception of carbanions, these intermediates do not obey the lewis octet rule, hence the high reactivity
 often generated on chemical decomposition of a chemical compound
 it is often possible to prove the existence of this species  by spectroscopic means
 cage effects have to be taken into account
 often stabilisation by conjugation or resonance
 often difficult to distinguish from a transition state
 prove existence by means of chemical trapping

Carbon

Other reactive intermediates
Carbenoid
Ion-neutral complex
Keto anions
Nitrenes
Oxocarbenium ions
Phosphinidenes
Phosphoryl nitride
Tetrahedral intermediates in carbonyl addition reactions

See also 
 Activated complex
 Transition state

References

Extranol  links

 
Reaction mechanisms